Paolo Mieli (born 25 February 1949) is an Italian journalist who has been editor of Italy's leading newspaper, Corriere della Sera.

Born in Milan, Mieli debuted as journalist at 18 for L'Espresso, where he remained for some 20 years. As a member of Potere Operaio he initially adhered to far-left positions. Later he took a more moderate stance under the influence and tutelage of his teachers, Rosario Romeo and Renzo De Felice. In 1971 he signed the Open letter to L'Espresso on the Pinelli case against the police officer Luigi Calabresi. 

From the 1980s Mieli worked for the most important Italian newspapers. After one year and a half at La Repubblica, he was hired by La Stampa in 1987. He became director in 1990. Two years later he moved to Il Corriere della Sera during the Tangentopoli bribe scandal. In May 1997 he was replaced by Ferruccio De Bortoli, assuming the position of editor-in-chief of RCS MediaGroup, publisher of Corriere della Sera. He continued his collaboration for that newspaper and returned as its director on 24 December 2004.

Mieli served as a member of RAI TV, Italy's state network, but turned down the opportunity to be Chair amid a 2003 controversy. As of September 2020, he is a member of the Italian Aspen Institute.

On 8 and 9 April 2022 he participates as a speaker in the conference entitled "Science and knowledge" organized by the Grand Orient of Italy at the Palacongressi in Rimini.

References

External links

 
  Corriere della Sera website

1949 births
Living people
Journalists from Milan
Italian newspaper editors
Italian male journalists
La Stampa editors